Kuningas Pähkinä & Setä Tamu is a Finnish collaborating duo starting 2000, made up of rapper Kuningas Pähkinä and Setä Tamu. They released an initial EP Kaikki suvussa in 2000, and had a successful single "Heitä paita vittuun" in 2003. Their first studio album, Kylpyammeellinen hittejä, came out in 2004.

However the duo's most successful release is the 2012 single "Hei Scully," which peaked at number two on the Official Finnish Singles Chart.

Setä Tamu, Kuningas Pähkinä and Stig joined forces in 2012 as the group Yön Polte and with the single "Tyttö sinä olet meritähti". The song peaked at number seven on the Official Finnish Singles Chart.

Discography

Albums

EPs
Kaikki suvussa (EP, 2000)
"Heitä paita vittuun" (single, 2003)
Syksyllä Palmasiin (EP, 2011)
Hiitti (EP, 2012)

Singles

References

Finnish musical groups